Une chance sur deux is a French film directed by Patrice Leconte, released in 1998, and starring Jean-Paul Belmondo, Alain Delon and Vanessa Paradis.

Synopsis 
Alice (Vanessa Paradis) leaves prison after having served an eight-month sentence for car theft. Her mother, who has just died, leaves her a cassette on which she admits to the mystery of her birth. Alice has never known her father. Twenty years before, her mother had loved two men (Belmondo, Delon). One of them is, unknowingly, her father. Alice goes off to find the two, but before discovering which is her father she gets them involved in an adventure.

Production
 Director : Patrice Leconte
 Screenplay : Patrick Dewolf, Serge Frydman and Patrice Leconte
 From a story by Bruno Tardon
 Production : Christian Fechner
 Executive producer : Hervé Truffaut
 Company : Les Films Christian Fechner, TF1 Films Production
 Original music : Alexandre Desplat
 Photography : Steven Poster
 Editing : Joëlle Hache
 Art direction : Ivan Maussion
 Costumes : Annie Périer
 Country : France
 Genre : Comedy / Action
 Length : 110 minutes
 Distributor : UGC Fox Distribution
 Release dates : 
 France : 25 March 1998
 Belgium : 1 April 1998

Cast

References

External links 
 
Une chance sur deux at Le Film Guide

1990s French-language films
1998 films
Films directed by Patrice Leconte
1990s adventure films
French adventure films
1990s French films